Zygmunt Aleksander Klemensiewicz  (24 April 1886 – 25 March 1963)  was a Polish physicist and physical chemist.
Early in his career (working for Fritz Haber in Karlsruhe), he made a pioneering contribution to the development of the glass electrode.

Life and career 
Klemensiewicz was born in Kraków.  His father, Robert, was a teacher of history and geography and a headmaster of a secondary school; his mother was a translator from Scandinavian languages into Polish.  From 1892 the family lived in Lwów, where he finished Polish gymnasium. In the years 1904–1908, he studied chemistry, physics, and mathematics at the Lwów University, where his professors included Wacław Sierpiński, Marian Smoluchowski, Stanisław Tołłoczko, Kazimierz Twardowski and Leonard Bronisław Radziszewski. In years 1908 - 1909, under a scholarship, he worked with Fritz Haber in Karlsruhe, i.a., on the potential of the glass electrode. In 1912, he passed his habilitation degree at Lwów. In the years 1913 - 1914, he worked with Marie Skłodowska-Curie in Paris, i.a., on the electrochemical properties of radium-B and thorium-B. During the WWI, he worked at first as a professor at the Pasteur Institute, and then in a plant manufacturing Solvarsan. In 1920 - 1940, he was an ordinary professor of physics and electronics at the Lwów Polytechnic. In years 1940 to 1942, he was in Kazakhstan (deported), then Iran, Egypt, and Great Britain (1944 until 1956). From 1956, he was a professor at the Silesian University of Technology in Gliwice.

Klemensiewicz was also an accomplished mountaineer and skier, author of the first Polish-language manual on mountain climbing (1913), co-founder and vice-president (1922–1939) of Polish Skiing Association (pl:Polski Związek Narciarski).  He died, aged 76, in Gliwice.

References 

20th-century Polish physicists
Polish mountain climbers
1886 births
1963 deaths
Sportspeople from Kraków
Polish physical chemists